Teresa Jornet Ibars (9 January 1843 – 26 August 1897), also known as Saint Teresa of Jesus, was a Spanish Catholic professed religious and the founder of the Little Sisters of the Abandoned Elderly.
Ibars was the great-niece of Francisco Palau and a friend and confidante of Saturnino López Novoa. Her dedication to the old and ill was noted, and her sisters' work in Spain and later abroad.

Her beatification was celebrated under Pope Pius XII on 27 April 1958 in Saint Peter's Basilica while Pope Paul VI later canonized her as a saint in 1974.

Life
Teresa Jornet Ibars was born on 9 January 1843 in a small town in Lleida to the farmers Francisco José Jornet and Antonieta Ibars. One sister was María, and another was Josefa, who became a Vincentian religious in Havana. Her brother Juan married and had three daughters who later joined her congregation. Her great-uncle was Blessed Francisco Palau – the brother of her maternal grandmother. She was baptized on 10 January 1843 and received her Confirmation in 1849.

In her childhood, she demonstrated a strong concern for the plight of the poor in her area, and she often took them to the home of her maternal aunt Rosa so that proper aid could be provided to them. She later moved elsewhere in Lleida to live with another aunt of hers and soon after, at the age of nineteen, began teaching at Argençola.

As she felt called to the monastic life, Ibars applied for admission to the Poor Clares near Burgos in 1868. However, the anti-clerical laws at the time prevented her from embracing the religious life. So in 1870, she became a member of the Secular Carmelites. Her father's death and a severe illness she contracted later confined her to her home for a prolonged period. Father Pedro Llacera introduced her to Saturnino López i Novoa, who became her spiritual director. He encouraged her to aid the old of the region who needed proper attention.

On 11 October 1872, she and her sister, Maria, moved to Barbastro with their friend Mercedes Calzada i Senan, and opened the first house. Ibars founded a religious congregation, taking the religious name "Teresa of Jesus" in honor of Teresa of Ávila. She was vested in the habit on 27 January 1873 and appointed the congregation's first superior. The motherhouse opened in Valencia on 8 May 1873. She was confirmed as the superior in 1875 and made her perpetual profession on 8 December 1877; in 1887, she was appointed as the superior general for the entire order. On 14 June 1876, the papal decree of praise for the order came from Pope Pius IX while Pope Leo XIII issued formal approval to the order on 24 August 1887. The general chapter for the order opened at Valencia on 23 April 1896, and she was re-elected as superior general despite begging the sisters not to elect her once more.

Cholera broke out in 1897 across the nation. Ibars tended to the victims before she retired to the order's house at Liria, where she remained for the next few months. She met Novoa for the final time on 15 July 1897. Ibars died due to tuberculosis on 26 August 1897 in Liria, and her remains were housed in Liria until their transferral on 1 June 1904 to Valencia; on 25 August 1913, the remains were reinterred in the same location. As of 2019, there were more than 2,000 religious in a total of 204 houses throughout 21 countries in Europe, Latin America, Africa, and Asia.

Canonization
The beatification process opened in Valencia on 23 April 1945. It concluded on 7 March 1946, at which point theologians collated all of Ibar's writings and approved them as being in line with official doctrine in a decree issued on 4 April 1948; the informative process later received the validation from the Congregation of Rites on 25 June 1954. The formal introduction to the cause came on 27 June 1952, and Ibars was titled a Servant of God. On 22 January 1957, Pope Pius XII named her Venerable upon the confirmation that Ibars led a life of heroic virtue. 

Pius XII beatified Ibars in Saint Peter's Basilica on 27 April 1958 upon the acknowledgment of two miracles attributed to her intercession while the confirmation of another two in 1973 allowed for Pope Paul VI to canonize her as a saint on 27 January 1974. In 1977, he proclaimed her the patron saint of old age in Spain.

See also
 Saint Teresa Jornet Ibars, patron saint archive

References

1843 births
1897 deaths
Canonizations by Pope Paul VI
19th-century Christian saints
19th-century Spanish nuns
19th-century venerated Christians
19th-century deaths from tuberculosis
Beatifications by Pope Pius XII
Catalan Roman Catholic saints
Christian female saints of the Late Modern era
Founders of Catholic religious communities
Spanish Roman Catholic saints
Third Order Carmelites
Venerated Carmelites
Tuberculosis deaths in Spain